The double genocide theory is the idea that two genocides of equal severity occurred in Eastern Europe, that of the Holocaust against Jews perpetrated by the Nazis and a second genocide that the Soviet Union committed against the local population. The theory first became popular in Lithuania in the early 1990s. A more aggressive version of the theory accuses Jews of complicity in Soviet repression and characterize local participation in the Holocaust as retaliation, especially in Lithuania, eastern Poland, and northern Romania.

Background 
According to political scientist Douglas Irvin-Erickson, "genocide discourses [are] highly effective in conferring moral capital upon certain actors in a conflict", a factor that increases the likelihood of a genocide frame being invoked by political actors. In 2010, political scientist Evgeny Finkel commented: "There is hardly any country in the vast region from Estonia in the north to Kazakhstan in the south in which either the authorities or the opposition have not seriously considered the idea of officially recognising past sufferings as genocides, often finding creative ways to reconcile the legal definition of the concept ... and the historical record."

Postulates 
Historian Vytautas Berenis commented that the double genocide theory has considerable influence in Lithuanian historiography. It consists of the postulates that (1) Jews actively participated in the Communist movement, (2) Jews welcomed the Red Army when it invaded Lithuania in 1940, and (3) Jews took part in Communist repressions. Berenis says that this theory is incorrect because most Jews did not support Communism and many Lithuanian Jews were victims of Soviet deportations. In October 1940, 68.49 percent of members of the Lithuanian Communist Party were ethnic Lithuanians, while 16.24 percent were Jews. Historian Alexander Karn writes that the idea of double genocide "hinge[s] upon the erasure of Lithuanian participation in the Holocaust". Ethnologist Carole Lemée sees it as a symptom of persistent antisemitism.

Poet and dissident Tomas Venclova criticized the concept of double genocide in his 1975 essay  ("Jews and Lithuanians") and subsequent publications. According to Venclova, the theory obscures the role of Lithuanians in crimes against humanity committed in Lithuania by assigning all guilt to non-Lithuanian actors.

Analysis 
According to Michael Shafir, the double genocide theory is at worst Holocaust obfuscation. Political scientist  sees it as a form of Holocaust trivialization. 

Scholar Dovid Katz sees the double genocide theory within the context of Holocaust obfuscation, a form of Holocaust denial where instead of outright denying the Holocaust existed its importance is diminished by equating it with crimes of far smaller magnitude. Katz describes it as a form of Holocaust revisionism, whose debate is prompted by a "movement in Europe that believes the crimes—morally, ethically—of Nazism and Communism are absolutely equal, and that those of us who don't think they're absolutely equal, are perhaps soft on Communism." According to Katz, the double genocide theory is "a relatively recent initiative (though rooted in older apologetics regarding the Holocaust) that seeks to create a moral equivalence between Soviet atrocities committed against the Baltic region and the Holocaust in European history." Katz writes that "the debate has garnered political traction/currency since the Baltic states joined the European Union in 2004. Since joining the EU, the Baltic states have attempted to downplay their nations' massive collaboration with the Nazis and to enlist the West in revising history in the direction of Double Genocide thinking." Katz recommends that "states in the region honor the victims of Communism and expose the evils of Communism as unique issues, 'without the equals-sign'."

Bloodlands and the Holocaust uniqueness debate 
Timothy Snyder's book Bloodlands: Europe Between Hitler and Stalin (2010) drew scholarly criticism for being seen as suggesting a moral equivalence between Soviet mass murders and the Nazi Holocaust. Historian Richard J. Evans commented: "It seems to me that he is simply equating Nazi genocide with the mass murders carried out in the Soviet Union under Stalin. ... There is nothing wrong with comparing. It's the equation that I find highly troubling." Efraim Zuroff refers to the book as "the equivalency canard". In a public debate in The Guardian starting in September 2010, Zuroff accused Snyder of providing a scholarly basis for "the historically-inaccurate 'double genocide' theories" by emphasizing the Molotov–Ribbentrop Pact and deflecting the full blame from the major culprit of the World War II. Katz commented that "Snyder flirts with the very wrong moral equivalence between Hitler and Stalin", to which Snyder responded: "I coincide with Zuroff and Katz on the centrality of the Holocaust, but we must not overlook how Stalin enabled Hitler's crimes." Katz says that Snyder's historical reassessment of the Nazi–Soviet pact coincides with Baltic ultranationalist agendas.

According to historian Thomas Kühne, going back to the Historikerstreit, conservative intellectuals such as Ernst Nolte and the Holocaust uniqueness debate, the attempts to link Soviet and Nazi crimes, citing books such as Snyder's Bloodlands as prominent examples, are "as politically tricky today as it was then. As it seems to reduce the responsibility of the Nazis and their collaborators, supporters and claqueurs, it is welcomed in rightist circles of various types: German conservatives in the 1980s, who wanted to 'normalise' the German past, and East European and ultranationalists today, who downplay Nazi crimes and up-play Communist crimes in order to promote a common European memory that merges Nazism and Stalinism into a 'double-genocide' theory that prioritises East European suffering over Jewish suffering, obfuscates the distinction between perpetrators and victims, and provides relief from the bitter legacy of East Europeans' collaboration in the Nazi genocide."

In New Directions in the History of the Jews in the Polish Lands (2018), historian Dan Michman laments that "[f]rom the perspective of today, one can say that the pendulum has even moved so far in emphasizing Eastern Europe from June 1941 onward, and first and foremost its killing sites as the locus of the Shoah, that one will find recent studies which entirely marginalize or even disregard the importance to the Holocaust of such essential issues as the 1930s in Germany and Austria; the persecution and murder of Western and Southern European Jewry; first steps of persecution in Tunisia and Libya; and other aspects of the Holocaust such as the enormous spoliation and the cultural warfare aimed at exorcising the jüdische Geist."

Memory politics and the Holocaust in Eastern Europe 
Red Holocaust was coined by the Institute of Contemporary History (Munich Institut für Zeitgeschichte) at Munich. Soviet and Communist studies scholar Steven Rosefielde referred to a "Red Holocaust" for all "peacetime state killings" under Communist states. According to historian , this term is not popular among scholars in Germany or internationally. Historian Alexandra Laignel-Lavastine writes that usage of this term "allows the reality it describes to immediately attain, in the Western mind, a status equal to that of the extermination of the Jews by the Nazi regime." Shafir states that the use of the term supports the "competitive martyrdom component of Double Genocide". Political scientist George Voicu writes that Leon Volovici has "rightfully condemned the abusive use of this concept as an attempt to 'usurp' and undermine a symbol specific to the history of European Jews." According to political scientist Jelena Subotić, the Holocaust memory was hijacked in post-Communist states in an attempt to erase fascist crimes and local participation to the Holocaust, and use their imagery to represent real or imagined crimes of Communist states as memory appropriation.

According to anthropologist Kristen Ghodsee, efforts to institutionalize the "double genocide thesis", or the moral equivalence between the Nazi Holocaust (race murder) and the victims of communism (class murder), in particular the push at the beginning of the global financial crisis for commemoration of the latter in Europe, can be seen as the response by economic and political elites to fears of a leftist resurgence in the face of devastated economies and extreme social inequalities in both the Eastern and Western worlds as the result of the excesses of neoliberal capitalism. She says that any discussion of the achievements by Communist states, including literacy, education, women's rights, and social security is usually silenced, and any discourse on the subject of communism is focused almost exclusively on Joseph Stalin's crimes and the "double genocide thesis", an intellectual paradigm summed up as such: "1) any move towards redistribution and away from a completely free market is seen as communist; 2) anything communist inevitably leads to class murder; and 3) class murder is the moral equivalent of the Holocaust." By linking all leftist and socialist ideals to the excesses of Stalinism, Ghodsee posits that the elites in the West hope to discredit and marginalize all political ideologies that could "threaten the primacy of private property and free markets".

In The Holocaust/Genocide Template in Eastern Europe (2020), political scientist Ljiljana Radonić discusses how "the 'memory wars' in the course of the post-Communist re-narration of history since 1989 and the current authoritarian backlash" and how mnemonic warriors' employ the 'Holocaust template' and the concept of genocide in tendentious ways to justify radical policies and externalize the culpability for their international isolation and worsening social and economic circumstances domestically." In this sense, "the 'double genocide' paradigm ... focuses on 'our own' national suffering under – allegedly 'equally' evil – Nazism and Communism". Radonić posits that this theory and charges of Communist genocide come from "a stable of anti-communist émigré lexicon since the 1950s and more recently revisionist politicians and scholars" as well as the "comparative trivialization" of the Holocaust that "results from tossing postwar killings of suspected Axis collaborators and opponents of Tito's regime into the same conceptual framework as the Nazi murder of six million of Jews", describing this as "an effort to demonize communism more broadly as an ideology akin to Nazism".

Notable cases 
In 2006, historian Yitzhak Arad, who was a prisoner of the Vilna Ghetto and was able to escape by joining the Soviet partisans, was labelled an "NKVD storm trooper" by Lithuanian newspaper Respublika. In 2008, two elderly Jewish women were investigated for their partisan activities. Arad cited those prosecutions as flowing from the double genocide theory, whose concept is described as follows: "In order to justify the participation of Lithuanians in the mass murder of Jews, there was a perceived need to invent Jews who similarly killed Lithuanians." In response to the investigations, Katz described this as a form of Holocaust obfuscation, another term for the double genocide theory, that "involves a series of false moral equivalences: Jews were disloyal citizens of pre-war Lithuania, helped the Soviet occupiers in 1940, and were therefore partly to blame for their fate. And the genocide that really matters was the one that Lithuanian people suffered at Soviet hands after 1944."

The Historical Museum of Serbia put on the highly-publicized exhibition "In the Name of the People – Political Repression in Serbia 1944–1953", which according to Subotić "promised to display new historical documents and evidence of communist crimes, ranging from assassinations, kidnappings and detentions in camps to collectivisation, political trials and repression" but actually showed "random and completely decontextualised photographs of 'victims of communism', which included innocent people but also many proven fascist collaborators, members of the quisling government, right-wing militias, and the Axis-allied Chetnik movement." Another example is the well-known photograph of prisoners from the Buchenwald concentration camp, which was displayed in the section devoted to a Communist-era camp for political prisoners on the Adriatic island of Goli Otok, describing it as "the example of living conditions of Goli Otok prisoners", and not correcting it after the misrepresentation was exposed. After an outcry from Holocaust historians, a small note was taped underneath the display caption that read: "Prisoners' bunk-beds in the Dachau camp." According to Subotić, this form of revisionism "has become so mainstream and state sponsored that in 2018 Croatian president Kolinda Grabar-Kitarović called for the creation of an international commission to determine the truth about the camp between 1941 and 1945, 'but also after' – indicating that the narrative that Jasenovac was a communist camp after the war was now accepted at the pinnacle of power."

See also 
 Black Ribbon Day
 Comparison of Nazism and Stalinism
 Genocide recognition politics
 Holocaust trivialization
 Prague Declaration
 The Seventy Years Declaration

References

Bibliography

External links 
 
 

Historiography of World War II
Holocaust historiography
Antisemitism
Holocaust denial